HMS Vervain was a  of the Royal Navy. She served during the Second World War.

In March 1942, the ship was adopted by the village of Queensbury in West Yorkshire.

On 28 February 1943 the liberty ship SS Wade Hampton was torpedoed by  while sailing in a convoy from New York to Murmansk, Russia. Survivors were picked up by Vervain and HMS Beverley near Greenland.

On 20 February 1945 at 11.45 hours Vervain was escorting a homeward-bound convoy when she was sunk by a torpedo from a U-boat,  under Oberleutnant zur See Karl-Heinz Wendt, about 25 miles south-east of Dungarvan, Ireland, south of Waterford. Vervain sank after 20 minutes. The commander, three officers and 56 ratings were lost.  Three officers and 30 ratings were rescued.
The action resulted in the loss of all 49 of the U-boat's crew.

HMS Vervain is a Designated vessel under schedule 1 of The Protection of Military Remains Act 1986 (Designation of Vessels and Controlled Sites) Order 2012.

References

Publications
 
 National Archives

External links

 

 

Flower-class corvettes of the Royal Navy
1941 ships
World War II shipwrecks in the Atlantic Ocean
Ships sunk by German submarines in World War II
Maritime incidents in February 1945
Ships built in Belfast
Ships built by Harland and Wolff